The NER Class 3CC (LNER Class D19) was a 4-4-0 steam locomotive designed by Wilson Worsdell for the North Eastern Railway and built in 1893.  Only one was built (number 1619) and it was a compound expansion version of the simple expansion NER Class M1.  The 3CC was originally classified M but was re-classified 3CC in 1914, at the same time as the M1 was re-classified M.

Overview
Number 1619 was built as a Worsdell-von Borries compound with two inside cylinders.  In 1898, it was rebuilt as a three-cylinder compound with one inside high-pressure cylinder and two outside low-pressure cylinders, as a test-bed for the development of Walter Mackersie Smith's ideas.

Classification
Aside from its compound expansion, the 3CC was similar to several other NER classes and they are summarised here:

 HP = high-pressure cylinder, LP = low-pressure cylinders

Operations
Around 1907 the Class 3CC locomotive was allocated from the Leeds area to Hull Botanic Gardens engine shed where it generally worked fast trains between Hull Paragon railway station and Bridlington. In 1926 it was transferred to Bridlington although its duties remained unchanged until withdrawal in October 1930.

Accident
On 31 March 1920, the Class 3CC locomotive was derailed at  station whilst hauling a passenger train.

Legacy
Number 1619 was a one-off but W. M. Smith went on to develop a four-cylinder compound system in the NER Class 4CC (LNER Class C8) 4-4-2 locomotive.  Number 1619 was withdrawn in 1930 and was not preserved.

Smith's three-cylinder compound system was also used in the Great Central Railway classes 8D and 8E (LNER Class C5) 4-4-2s and achieved its greatest success in the Midland Railway 1000 Class and the LMS Compound 4-4-0. The Great Northern Railway (Ireland)'s class V was also a Smith compound.

References

Sources

Further reading 

 
 LNER Encyclopedia
 

3CC
4-4-0 locomotives
Three-cylinder compound steam locomotives
Railway locomotives introduced in 1893
Scrapped locomotives
Standard gauge steam locomotives of Great Britain
2′B n3v locomotives
Passenger locomotives